The 127th Regiment of Foot was an infantry regiment of the British Army, created in 1794 and disbanded in 1796. It was raised under the colonelcy of General John Cradock, 1st Baron Howden.

References

External links

Infantry regiments of the British Army
Military units and formations established in 1794
Military units and formations disestablished in 1796
1794 establishments in Great Britain
1796 disestablishments in Great Britain